Ben Beaury (born May 13, 1996) is an American soccer player who currently plays as a goalkeeper.

Career

College and amateur
Beaury played college soccer at Le Moyne College from 2014 to 2017, where he made 76 appearances. 

While at college, Beaury appeared for USL PDL side Reading United AC in 2016 and 2017.

Professional
On May 31, 2018, Beaury signed with USL Championship side Charlotte Independence.

On December 19, 2018, Beaury was confirmed as a new signing for USL Championship side New Mexico United ahead of their inaugural season. He made his professional debut on September 28, 2019, starting in a 2–2 draw with Phoenix Rising.

Beaury was loaned to Reno 1868 FC ahead of the restart of the coronavirus-delayed 2020 USL Championship season.

On February 1, 2021, Beaury was signed by Oakland Roots SC ahead of its first season in the USL Championship.

Beaury joined El Paso Locomotive FC on May 20, 2021, without having made an appearance for Oakland Roots. He then left at the end of the season, making 2 appearances for the club.

Career statistics

Club

References

1996 births
Living people
American soccer players
Association football goalkeepers
Le Moyne Dolphins men's soccer players
Reading United A.C. players
Charlotte Independence players
New Mexico United players
Reno 1868 FC players
Oakland Roots SC players
El Paso Locomotive FC players
Soccer players from New York (state)
USL League Two players
USL Championship players
People from Cohoes, New York
Sportspeople from Albany, New York